The Cleveland mayoral election of 1935 saw Harold Hitz Burton defeat former mayor  Ray T. Miller.

General election

References

Mayoral elections in Cleveland
Cleveland mayoral
Cleveland
November 1935 events
1930s in Cleveland